Mission: Possible is a 2021 South Korean action comedy film written and directed by Kim Hyung-joo. Based on the Mission: Impossible series by Bruce Geller, the film stars Lee Sun-bin and Kim Young-kwang, following the antics of secret agent Da-hee and an ex-special agent, present-private detective Soo-han. The film was released in South Korea on February 17, 2021.

According to Korean Film Council data, it is at 11th place among all the Korean films released in the year 2021 in South Korea, with gross of US$3.56 million and 447,111 admissions, .

Plot
The Chinese MSS receives vital information about an illegal supply of firearms from China to Korea where they send a rookie officer named Wong Iring to investigate and capture the smugglers. Iring's next plan is to infiltrate Korea as Yoo Dae-Hee and meet a Korean special operative, but ends up meeting a detective and former NIS agent named Woo Soo-Han. Dae-Hee tells Soo-Han about the mission and present target SI Chem Park Du-Sik, a rare-earth element importer from China, who is actually involved in arms smuggling. The duo follow Du-Sik to a cafè in Gangnam. 

After a topsy-turvy ball dance, the duo manages to acquire his phone, only to find it is a flip phone. After keeping the phone back, Du-Sik receives a call and while chatting with someone, he gets killed with a dart and his death has been faked as a heart attack. The next day, Soo-Han and Dae-Hee receive the news about the Rodeo mob boss has been shot while leaving from his club. After interrogating a fortune teller advised by Soo-Han, the duo head to meet Rodeo boss rival Axe Clan where they meet the clan's boss, but are soon attacked by masked men. Soo-Han and Dae-Hee escape, but not before retrieving the clan's boss's phone. 

With the help of a hacker, the duo reaches the person's address where they find the person dead and deduce that he had been killed 3 days ago. The duo learns about the person's identity as Kim Yeong-Gu, the security head of Mugwang International and also learns about its execs Director Jeon-Hoon. Soo-Han remembers that Jeon-Hoon was the one who threatened Du-Sik after he had checked his phone. The duo learn that a party is held at Alvin hotel the next day.  Soo-Han and Dae-Hee leave for the party. Despite knowing that Jeon-Hoon is their boss killer, the Axe Clan makes a arms deal to sell arms at midnight. Soo-Han and Dae-Hee are exposed where they are captured and brought to Jeon-Hoon, who orders Soo-Han to kill cops at a local police station in exchange for Dae-Hee's life. 

Soo-Han is escorted to the police station, but he injures Jeon-Hoon's men and reaches back at the hotel, only to find that Dae-Hee is escorted somewhere. The cops arrest Soo-Han, where he is visited by the NIS, who learns about Dae-Hee's real identity and that she is sent as a 'sacrifice' to die in the mission. Soo-Han escapes from the station and reaches the hideout where the deal between Jeon-Hoon and the Axe Clan is headed. Soo-Han frees Dae-Hee and kills Xia-rong, one of the assassin Da-rong's brother, which alerts the gangsters and they head to kill the duo. Soo-Han and Dae-Hee manages to kill/arrest all the gangsters including Da-rong and Jeon-Hoon. 

Later, Soo-Han gets arrested, but is offered a deal by the NIS and MSS to become a secret agent in exchange for his release. Soo-Han agrees, where he, along with Dae-Hee are sent to Russia for their next mission.

Cast
 Lee Sun-bin as Wong Iring/Yoo Da-hee
 Kim Young-kwang as Woo Soo-han
 Oh Dae-hwan as Jeon-Hoon
 Kim Tae-hoon as Shin Ki-roo
 Seo Hyun-chul as Detective squad chief
 Choi Byung-mo as Team leader Cha Oh
 Na Kwang-hoon as Chinese MSS director
 Seo Beom-sik as Ax gang boss
 Woo Kang-min as Korean mercenary leader
 Jang Se-ah   
 Park Ji-yeon as police woman
 Julien Kang as Yoo Ri
 Lee Do-gyeom as Hotel staff
 Shin Hye-jeong guest appearance

Special appearance
 Hwang Jung-min as Dorothy 
 Hong Seok-cheon as Hong Seok-cheon 
 Jang Won-young as doctor 
 Kim Ho-young as fortune-teller

Production

Casting
The project was conceived in June 2019.  
Lee Sun-bin and Kim Young-kwang were cast in June 2019 to play secret agents in action comedy.

Filming
The filming began on September 5, 2019  and was wrapped up on December 4, 2019.

Reception

Box office

The film released on February 17, 2021 on 930 screens remained at the number 1 place at the Korean box office, for the first week of its release, collecting 26,000 audiences on first day, 23,000 persons on second day, 23,965 on the third day, 53,445 people on the 4th day, 52,969 people on the 5th day, 18,558 audiences on the 6th day, and 18,321 audiences on the 7th day,
taking cumulative number of audiences to 217,766, according to Integrated Computer Network for Cinema Admission Tickets.

According to Korean Film Council data, it is at 11th place among all the Korean films released in the year 2021, with gross of US$3.56 million and 447,111 admissions, .
 The system of KOBIS (Korean Box Office Information System) is managed by KOFIC.

Critical response

Going by Korean review aggregator Naver Movie Database, the film holds an approval rating of 8.41 from the audience.

References

External links
 
 
 
 
 

2020s Korean-language films
2021 films
South Korean action comedy films
South Korean spy action films
South Korean spy comedy films
Films set in South Korea
Films about organized crime in South Korea
Films about the National Intelligence Service (South Korea)